
Year 773 (DCCLXXIII) was a common year starting on Friday (link will display the full calendar) of the Julian calendar. The denomination 773 for this year has been used since the early medieval period, when the Anno Domini calendar era became the prevalent method in Europe for naming years.

Events 
 By place 

 Europe 
 Summer – King Charlemagne and his uncle Bernard, son of Charles Martel, cross the Alps with a Frankish expeditionary force at the request of Pope Adrian I. At the foot of the mountains in the Susa Valley (Northern Italy), the Franks are hindered by Lombard fortifications. After scouting, Charlemagne attacks the defenders from the flank, and forces the Lombards to flee to the fortified capital Pavia.
 Siege of Pavia: Charlemagne besieges Pavia, which is poorly stocked with food. King Desiderius remains in the capital, and orders his son Adalgis to defend Verona to guard Gerberga, and the children of Carloman I. After a short siege, Adalgis flees to Constantinople, where he is received by Emperor Constantine V. Meanwhile, the Franks capture the cities of Verona and Mortara. 
 Saxon Wars: Saxon forces seize upon Charlemagne's preoccupation with Italy to retake Eresburg and Syburg (near Dortmund). They unsuccessfully attack the episcopal centre of Büraburg, which had been established by St. Boniface (see 723).

 Britain 
 King Alhred of Northumbria makes overtures of friendship toward Charlemagne (approximate date).

 Abbasid Caliphate 
 The number 0 is introduced to the city of Baghdad, which will be developed in the Middle East by Arabian mathematicians, who will base their numbers on the Indian system (long after the Maya culture developed the concept, cf. Maya numerals).

 Asia 
 King Khongtekcha of Manipur (modern India) dies after a 10-year reign; during his rule the Meitei language script first appears.

 By topic 

 Ecology 
 A large and sudden increase in radiocarbon (14C) occurs around 773, in coral skeletons from the South China Sea (see 774-775 carbon-14 spike).

Births 
 Duan Wenchang, chancellor of the Tang Dynasty (d. 835)
 Fujiwara no Otsugu, Japanese statesman (d. 843)
 Heizei, emperor of Japan (d. 824)
 Li Su, general of the Tang Dynasty (d. 821)
 Liu Zongyuan, Chinese poet and official (d. 819)
 Pepin of Italy, son of Charlemagne (d. 810)
 Peter of Atroa, Byzantine abbot and saint (d. 837)
 Wei Chuhou, chancellor of the Tang Dynasty (d. 829)

Deaths 
 June 11 – Li Miao, Tang dynasty Chinese prince
 Brochfael ap Elisedd, king of Powys (Wales)
 Donn Cothaid mac Cathail, king of Connacht (Ireland)
 Khongtekcha, king of Manipur (India)
 Rōben, Japanese Buddhist monk (b. 689)
 Xue Song, general of the Yan and Tang Dynasties

References